Nathan "Nate" Ball is an American mechanical engineer, entrepreneur, TV host, children's author, pole vaulter, and beatboxer.

Early life
He was born May 13, 1983 and grew up in Newport, Oregon. He moved to Boston in 2001 to attend Massachusetts Institute of Technology, where he studied mechanical engineering and earned two degrees: a Bachelor of Science (2005) and a Master of Science (2007). At MIT he was a two-time NCAA All-American pole-vaulter with a personal record of 16' 8 ¾",

Media
Ball has served as a host on the PBS Kids show Design Squad since it first aired in 2007. Ball has appeared in an episode of MythBusters, a History Channel special on Batman technology, in an insurance advertisement, and in a Fetch! with Ruff Ruffman season 4 episode. Ball was also featured in the Nova episode The Secret Life of Scientists and Engineers. He is the author of the Alien in my Pocket series of science-adventure chapter books for kids.

Inventions
In 2005 he co-founded a business to develop the Atlas Powered Ascender, a tool he helped create that enables "reverse rappelling" up vertical surfaces at high speed. He was awarded the Lemelson-MIT Prize in 2007 for his work on the Atlas Powered Ascender, an improved needle-free jet injector system, and his work in engineering outreach with children. He is listed as the co-inventor on six patent applications, including for the Powered Rope Ascender.<

References

External links
 Atlas Devices, LLC
 PBS Kids - Design Squad Nation

1983 births
Living people
American male pole vaulters
Ball, Nathan
People from Newport, Oregon
21st-century American inventors